In Norse mythology, Svaðilfari (perhaps "unlucky traveler") is a stallion that fathered the eight-legged horse Sleipnir with Loki (in the form of a mare). Svaðilfari was owned by the disguised and unnamed jötunn who built the walls of Asgard.

Attestations

Gylfaginning

In chapter 42 of the Prose Edda book Gylfaginning, High tells a story set "right at the beginning of the gods' settlement, when the gods had established Midgard and built Val-Hall" about an unnamed builder who offered to build a fortification for the gods that would keep out invaders in exchange for Freyja, the sun, and the moon. After some debate, the gods agreed to this but placed a number of restrictions on the builder, including that he complete the work within one season. The builder made a single request: that he could have help from his stallion Svaðilfari, and under Loki's influence, this was allowed. The stallion Svaðilfari performed twice the builder's deeds of strength and hauled enormous rocks, to the surprise of the gods. The builder, with Svaðilfari, made fast progress on the wall, and three days before the deadline of summer, the builder was nearly at the entrance to the fortification. The gods convene and unanimously agreed that, along with most trouble, Loki was to blame.

The gods declared that Loki would face severe repercussions if he did not come up with a scheme that would cause the builder to forfeit his payment. Loki, afraid, swore that he would devise a scheme to force the builder into a corner, whatever it would cost himself. That night, the builder drove out to fetch stones with Svaðilfari, and out from the woods, into the clearing, ran a beautiful mare who was, in fact, Loki in disguise. The mare approached and neighed at Svaðilfari, and Svaðilfari became frantic, neighed, tore apart his tack, and ran towards the mare. The mare suddenly turned and ran into the woods in a fast gallop, away from the stallion. Svaðilfari began to follow, and the builder chased after. The two horses ran around all night, causing the building work to be held up for the night. Seeing that the wall would not be finished in time, the builder went into a rage, revealing he was a bergrisi.

When the Æsir realized that the builder was a jötunn, they disregarded their previous oaths with the builder and called for Thor who quickly arrived and killed the builder with Mjöllnir. Due to his night with Svaðilfari, Loki became pregnant and later gave birth to a grey foal with eight legs - the famed horse Sleipnir.

See also
 Horses of the Æsir
 List of fictional horses

Notes

References
 Faulkes, Anthony (Trans.) (1995). Edda. Everyman. 
 Orchard, Andy (1997). Dictionary of Norse Myth and Legend. Cassell. 

Horses in Norse mythology
Horses in mythology
Loki